Amua Union (Bengali:আমুয়া ইউনিয়ন) is one of the six union councils under Kathalia Upazila of Jhalakati District in the Barishal Division of southern region of Bangladesh.

Geography 
Amua Union is situated at the Kathalia Sadar of Kathalia Upazila.

Area 
Amua has an area of 6,194 acres.

Administration

Administrative Structure 
Amua Union is the 3rd Union Parishad Under Kathalia Upazila.The administrative activities of this union is under Kathalia Union Parishad. This is included in the 125 No. Electoral Area Jhalakathi-1 of National Parliament .

Administrative Areas 
At Present, there is 6 villages under Amua Union.The administrative activities of this union is under Amua Union Parishad.

Demographics 
According to Census-2011, The total population of Amua Union is 24,053.Among them number of male is 11,736 and number of female is 12,317.Number of total family is 6,333.

Education 
The literacy rate of Amua Union is about 95%.

Number of Educational Institution 
 Primary School-22
 Madrasa-06
 College-01

Places of interest

Halta River 
Amua is situated at the bank of Halta river which is very popular. Many steamers, boats ply from the river. It is at the south of Amua. On the east side of the river there is Upazila Health Complex, Amua Bazar at West, Bamna Ferryghat at south and Amua Union Parishad, Food Storage and Post Office is at the North.

Notable personalities 
The Notable Personalities of Amua Union are:

 Late Dhiren Dutta
 Late Nurul Huda Sikder
 Late Ismail Jomadder
 Advocate Fazlul Haque

See also 
 Upazilas of Bangladesh
 Districts of Bangladesh
 Divisions of Bangladesh

References

External links 

Unions of Kathalia Upazila
Jhalokati District